A hair's breadth, or the width of human hair, is used as an informal unit of a very short length.  It connotes "a very small margin" or the narrowest degree in many contexts.

Definitions

This measurement is not precise because human hair varies in diameter, ranging anywhere from 17 μm to 181 μm [millionths of a metre] One nominal value often chosen is 75 μm, but this – like other measures based upon such highly variable natural objects, including the barleycorn – is subject to a fair degree of imprecision.

Such measures can be found in many cultures. The English "hair's breadth" has a direct analogue in the formal Burmese system of Long Measure. A "tshan khyee", the smallest unit in the system, is literally a "hair's breadth". 10 "tshan khyee" form a "hnan" (a Sesamum seed), 60 (6 hnan) form a mooyau (a species of grain), and 240 (4 mooyau) form an "atheet" (literally, a "finger's breadth").

Some formal definitions even existed in English. In several systems of English Long Measure, a "hair's breadth" has a formal definition. Samuel Maunder's Treasury of Knowledge and Library of Reference, published in 1855, states that a "hair's breadth" is one 48th of an inch (and thus one 16th of a barleycorn). John Lindley's An introduction to botany, published in 1839, and William Withering' An Arrangement of British Plants, published in 1818, states that a "hair's breadth" is one 12th of a line, which is one 144th of an inch or ~176 μm (a line itself being one 12th of an inch).

Other body part measurements
Winning a competition, such as a horse race, "by a whisker" (a short beard hair) is a narrower margin of victory than winning "by a nose."  An even narrower anatomically-based margin might be described in the idiom "by the skin of my teeth," which is typically applied to a narrow escape from impending disaster. This is roughly analogous to the phrase "as small as the hairs on a gnat's bollock." German speakers similarly use “Muggeseggele,” literally “housefly’s scrotum,” as a small unit of measurement.

See also
Beard-second
List of humorous units of measurement
List of unusual units of measurement
Indefinite and fictitious numbers

References

Notes

Citations

Sources

\

English grammar
English-language idioms
Idioms
Units of length
Human hair